The 1962 Wisconsin gubernatorial election was held on November 6, 1962.   Democrat John W. Reynolds won the election with 51% of the vote, winning his first term as Governor of Wisconsin and defeating Republican Philip Kuehn. , this was the last time Menominee County voted for the Republican candidate. Until 2022, this was the last gubernatorial election where a Democratic governor was elected during the tenure of a Democratic president.

Results

References 

1962
Wisconsin
November 1962 events in the United States
1962 Wisconsin elections